James Wildman (20 March 1747 – 23 March 1816) was a British politician and the Member of Parliament for Hindon from 1796 to 1802.

See also
 List of MPs in the first United Kingdom Parliament

References

1747 births
1816 deaths
British MPs 1796–1800
UK MPs 1801–1802
Members of the Parliament of Great Britain for English constituencies
Members of the Parliament of the United Kingdom for English constituencies